Milford Haven School is an English medium comprehensive co-educational school of 1061 students (including 6th form), in Milford Haven, Wales.

History and Catchment

The site of the school was the former Milford Haven Grammar School, opened in 1964.  In 1988, a remodelled Comprehensive school was opened, incorporating pupils of the former Central Secondary Modern School. The site had initially been the subject of some criticism of its suitability, due to both its inconvenient distance from the town centre, and also the potential danger of locating the school beside a main road. Its catchment area includes the town of Milford Haven and the area extending westwards to Dale. Just over 18% of pupils are eligible for free school meals compared with the Welsh average of about 15% for secondary schools. Very few pupils come from Welsh-speaking homes. Just under 2% of pupils have
statements of special educational needs.

Sixth Form
In October 2019, school governors wrote to Pembrokeshire County Council requesting that a consultation be carried out to end sixth form provision.  Falling pupil numbers, reduced curriculum options and provision not meeting the needs of learners were cited as contributory factors.  The announcement provoked a negative reaction in the local community, the response included an online petition and concerns that pupils would have to travel long distances for sixth form education.

Accommodation and Facilities

The school is located in the northern outskirts of Milford Haven, bordering Steynton.  It is surrounded by agricultural land to the north, and private housing estates to the east and west.  In addition to the original buildings which comprised the grammar school, four newer blocks are integrated into this structure.  Sports facilities include a multi-purpose sports hall and a gymnasium, tennis courts and an all-weather pitch with flood-lighting.

Staff
There are 61 teaching staff, including the Headteacher, two Deputy Heads and two Assistant Heads. Headteacher Mr Islwyn Morgan retired in December 2012, and in January 2013 was replaced by Mr Rod Francis. Rod Francis left the position in September 2017 and was replaced by Acting Headteacher, Beverley Davies. Ceri-Ann Morris took up the position permanently in April 2018.

Controversy
The school became the subject of controversy in October 2013 when a pupil was punished for shaving his head to raise money for charity. This led to a protest on Friday 4 October 2013 attended by 353 pupils, which resulted in the pupil being permitted to return.  A joint statement was released by Miss O'Neill (parent of the pupil) and Milford Haven School following the incident.  In January 2019 the school became the focus of media attention due to two alleged incidents of bullying.  Police were called to the school site on 11 January, responding to an incident in which a male pupil was filmed appearing to be assaulted by a large group of children.   The video was shared widely on social media.  Later in January, a fourteen year old vegan pupil at the school claimed that he was assaulted, and force fed bacon. The boy was left with post-concussion syndrome. The school's spokesman said: 'the matter has been dealt with in accordance with the Governing Body's approved policies and procedures', but according to the pupil's mother, they still feel let down by the school.  In 2017, 14 year old pupil Megan Evans committed suicide at her home, after allegedly being bullied.  Her parents accused the school of inaction, in spite of claiming they made it aware of the situation, contributing to her death.  A coroner's decision is anticipated in 2020.

Notable alumni
Sarah Waters, an award-winning novelist.
John Cooper, a serial killer from Milford Haven attended the Grammar School.
Andrew Salter (born 1993), cricketer
George Winter, actor who appeared in the films Scum, and All Quiet on the Western Front.
Rosalyn Wild, finalist in Britain's Kindest Kid.
Sarah Howells, a British singer-songwriter and trance vocalist.

External links
Milford Haven School
 The Development of Secondary Education in Milford Haven 1902 - 1964 Johnson, Barry, 1974

References 

Secondary schools in Pembrokeshire
Educational institutions established in 1988
Milford Haven
1988 establishments in Wales
Buildings and structures in Milford Haven